Land reclamation, usually known as reclamation, and also known as land fill (not to be confused with a waste landfill), is the process of creating new land from oceans, seas, riverbeds or lake beds. The land reclaimed is known as reclamation ground or land fill.

In some jurisdictions, including parts of the United States, the term "reclamation" can refer to returning disturbed lands to an improved state. In Alberta, Canada, for example, reclamation is defined by the provincial government as "The process of reconverting disturbed land to its former or other productive uses." In Oceania, it is frequently referred to as land rehabilitation.

History
One of the earliest large-scale projects was the Beemster Polder in the Netherlands, realized in 1612 adding  of land. In Hong Kong the Praya Reclamation Scheme added  of land in 1890 during the second phase of construction. It was one of the most ambitious projects ever taken during the Colonial Hong Kong era.  Some 20% of land in the Tokyo Bay area has been reclaimed, most notably Odaiba artificial island.	Le Portier, Monaco and Gibraltar are also expanding due to land reclamation. The city of Rio de Janeiro was largely built on reclaimed land, as was Wellington, New Zealand.

Methods
Land reclamation can be achieved by a number of different methods. The simplest method involves filling the area with large amounts of heavy rock and/or cement, then filling with clay and dirt until the desired height is reached. The process is called "infilling" and the material used to fill the space is generally called "infill". Draining of submerged wetlands is often used to reclaim land for agricultural use. Deep cement mixing is used typically in situations in which the material displaced by either dredging or draining may be contaminated and hence needs to be contained. Land dredging is also another method of land reclamation. It is the removal of sediments and debris from the bottom of a body of water. It is commonly used for maintaining reclaimed land masses as sedimentation, a natural process, fills channels and harbors.

Notable instances

Africa
 The Foreshore in Cape Town
 The Hassan II Mosque in Morocco is built on reclaimed land.
The Eko Atlantic in Lagos, Nigeria.
Gracefield Island in Lekki, Lagos, Nigeria.

Asia
 The whole 3 km2 business district of Cebu South Road Properties in Cebu City, Philippines
 Some of the coastline of Saadiyat Island, in the UAE. Used for commercial purposes.
 Much of the coastline of Mumbai, India. It took over 150 years to join the original Seven Islands of Bombay. These seven islands were lush, green, thickly wooded, and dotted with 22 hills, with the Arabian Sea  washing through them at high tide. The original Isle of Bombay was only 24 km long and 4 km wide from Dongri to Malabar Hill (at its broadest point) and the other six were Colaba, Old Woman's Island, Mahim, Parel, Worli and Mazgaon. (See also Hornby Vellard).
 Much of the coastlines of Mainland China, Hong Kong, North Korea and South Korea. It is estimated that nearly 65% of tidal flats around the Yellow Sea have been reclaimed.
 Inland lowlands in the Yangtze valley, China, including the areas of important cities like Shanghai and Wuhan.
 Much of the coastline of Karachi, Pakistan.
 The shore of Jakarta Bay. Land is usually reclaimed to create new housing areas and real estate properties, for the rapidly expanding city of Jakarta. So far, the largest reclamation project in the city is the creation of Golf Island, north of Pantai Indah Kapuk.
 The entire island of The Pearl-Qatar situated in West Bay (Doha), Qatar.
 Haikou Bay, Hainan Province, China, where the west side of Haidian Island is being extended, and off the coast of Haikou, where new land for a marina is being created.
 The Cotai area of Macau, where many casinos are located
 Nagoya Centrair Airport, Japan
 Incheon International Airport, South Korea
 Beirut Central District, Lebanon
 The southern Chinese city of Shenzhen
 The shore of Manila Bay in the Philippines, especially along Metro Manila, has attracted major developments such as the Mall of Asia Complex, Entertainment City and the Cultural Center of the Philippines Complex.
 The city-state of Singapore, where land is in short supply, is also famous for its efforts on land reclamation.
 The Palm Islands, The World and hotel Burj al-Arab off Dubai in the United Arab Emirates
 The Yas Island in Abu Dhabi, UAE.
 Hulhumalé Island, Maldives. It is one of the six divisions of Malé City.
 Giant Sea Wall Jakarta
 Colombo International Financial City, Sri Lanka
 Kansai International Airport, Osaka, Japan
 Forest City, an integrated residential and tourism district in Johor, Malaysia
 My Suva park (Fiji), a recreation park for the Greater Suva area

Europe
 Airport of Nice, France
 Large parts of the Netherlands
 Almost all of the Thames estuary including large parts of London
 Almost half of the microstate of Monaco
 Most of Fontvieille, Monaco
 Parts surrounding Port Hercules in La Condamine, Monaco
 Parts of Dublin, Ireland including the North Wall, East Wall, Grand Canal Dock and Bull Island
 Parts of Bryggen, Bergen, Norway including the Dreggekaien cruise terminal and other ship services
 Most of Belfast Harbour and areas of Belfast, Northern Ireland, United Kingdom
 Parts of Saint Petersburg, Russia, such as the Marine Facade
 Helsinki (of which the major part of the city center is built on reclaimed land)
 Barceloneta area, Barcelona, in Spain
 The port of Zeebrugge in Belgium
 The southwestern residential area in Brest, Belarus
 Majority of left-bank and some right-bank residential areas of Kyiv were built on a reclaimed fens and floodplains of the Dnieper river.
 The airport peninsula, the industrial area of Cornigliano, the PSA container terminal and other parts of the port in Genoa, Italy
 The Fens in East Anglia
 Venice, Italy
 Rione Orsini, part of Borgo Santa Lucia, Naples
 A big part of Kavala, city in Greece
 Fucine Lake, Italy
 Waterfront Centre, St. Helier, Jersey
 Airports of Trabzon, Giresun and Rize
 Coastal parks and streets of Istanbul
 Yenikapı, Turkey
 Lake Copais, Greece
 Certain areas of Denmark

North America
 Notre Dame Island in Montreal (Quebec, Canada). In the Saint Lawrence River, 15 million tons of rock excavated from the Montreal Metro underground rail in 1965 to form an artificial island.
 The Chicago shoreline
 The Northwestern University Lakefill, part of the campus of Northwestern University in Evanston, Illinois
 Several neighborhoods in Boston, Massachusetts are the result of landfill.
 Battery Park City, Manhattan
 Several islands in Biscayne Bay in the Miami metropolitan area, including the  Venetian Islands, are the result of landfill.
 Brooklyn Bridge Park, Brooklyn
 Liberty State Park, Jersey City
 Leslie Street Spit, the downtown waterfront south of Front Street, and sections of the Toronto Islands in Toronto.
 Part of Nuns' Island in Montreal
The Potter's Cay in Nassau, The Bahamas was connected to the island of New Providence
The shore of Nassau, The Bahamas especially along East Bay street.
 Parts of New Orleans (which is partially built on land that was once swamp)
 Much of the urbanized area adjacent to San Francisco Bay, including most of San Francisco's waterfront and Financial District, San Francisco International Airport, the Port of Oakland, and large portions of the city of Alameda has been reclaimed from the bay.
 Large hills in Seattle were removed and used to create Harbor Island and reclaim land along Elliott Bay. In particular, the neighborhoods of SoDo, Seattle and Interbay are largely built on filled wetlands.
 Mexico City (which is situated at the former site of Lake Texcoco); the chinampas are a famous example.
 Much of Bermuda's St David's Island are reclaimed; the island, the site of Bermuda's international airport, was formerly several smaller islands.

Oceania
 Most of Barangaroo, a current commercial and residential suburb in the central business district of Sydney, New South Wales.
 Parts of Darling Harbour, a locality west of the Sydney central business district.
 A large portion of the southern suburb of Sylvania Waters in Sydney, Australia.
 The southernmost portions of runways at Sydney Airport.
 Large portions of Port Botany in metropolitan Sydney.
 Large amounts of the Melbourne Docklands.
 Portions of the Swan River foreshore adjoining the Perth central business district in Western Australia, including the entirety of Mounts Bay (pictured above).
 Considerable areas of Dunedin, New Zealand, including the "Southern Endowment", stretching from the central city to the southeastern suburbs along the shore of Otago Harbour. 
 Prior to the Napier earthquake of 1931, significant reclamation of the then-lagoon was undertaken in areas of Napier South and Ahuriri. There were also minor reclamation works undertaken after 1931 on the new low-lying lands brought up by the earthquake. 
 Areas around Wellington and Auckland's harbours have also been reclaimed.

South America
 Parts of Panama City urban and street development are based on reclaimed land, using material extracted from Panama Canal excavations.
The Cinta Costera, in Panama City, Panama
 The entire riverfront of Buenos Aires, Argentina including the port and an airport
 Large parts of Rio de Janeiro, most notably several blocks in the new docks area, the entire Flamengo Park and the neighborhood of Urca
 Parts of Florianópolis.
 Parts of the Historic District of Porto Alegre, including the docks of Port of Porto Alegre and the Beira-Rio Stadium, were built on reclaimed lands of Lake Guaíba between the end of the 19th century and the 1970s.
 Santa Cruz del Islote, in the Caribbean Sea of Colombia, one of the most densely populated islands in the world, was built in an artificial way gaining land from the sea.
 Parts of the Vargas State in the north of Venezuela, parts of Los Monjes Archipelago, the Isla Paraíso (paradise island) in the Anzoátegui State and the La Salina island in the Zulia State, were built with land reclaimed from the sea.
 Parts of Montevideo, Uruguay, Rambla Sur and several projects still going on in Montevideo's Bay.
 Parts of Valparaíso, Chile.

Agriculture

Agriculture was a driver of land reclamation before industrialisation.  In South China, farmers reclaimed paddy fields by enclosing an area with a stone wall on the sea shore near a river mouth or river delta.  The species of rice that are grown on these grounds are more salt tolerant. Another use of such enclosed land is the creation of fish ponds. It is commonly seen on the Pearl River Delta and Hong Kong. These reclaimed areas also attract species of migrating birds.

A related practice is the draining of swampy or seasonally submerged wetlands to convert them to farmland. While this does not create new land exactly, it allows commercially productive use of land that would otherwise be restricted to wildlife habitat. It is also an important method of mosquito control.

Even in the post-industrial age, there have been land reclamation projects intended for increasing available agricultural land. For example, the village of Ogata in Akita, Japan, was established on land reclaimed from Lake Hachirōgata (Japan's second largest lake at the time) starting in 1957. By 1977, the amount of land reclaimed totalled .

Artificial islands
Artificial islands are an example of land reclamation. Creating an artificial island is an expensive and risky undertaking. It is often considered in places with high population density and a scarcity of flat land. Kansai International Airport (in Osaka) and Hong Kong International Airport are examples where this process was deemed necessary. The Palm Islands, The World and hotel Burj al-Arab off Dubai in the United Arab Emirates are other examples of artificial islands (although there is yet no real "scarcity of land" in Dubai), as well as the Flevopolder in the Netherlands which is the largest artificial island in the world.

Beach restoration

Beach rebuilding is the process of repairing beaches using materials such as sand or mud from inland. This can be used to build up beaches suffering from beach starvation or erosion from longshore drift. It stops the movement of the original beach material through longshore drift and retains a natural look to the beach. Although it is not a long-lasting solution, it is cheap compared to other types of coastal defences. An example of this is the city of Mumbai.

Landfill
As human overcrowding of developed areas intensified during the 20th century, it has become important to develop land re-use strategies for completed landfills.  Some of the most common usages are for parks, golf courses and other sports fields. Increasingly, however, office buildings and industrial uses are made on a completed landfill. In these latter uses, methane capture is customarily carried out to minimize explosive hazard within the building.

An example of a Class A office building constructed over a landfill is the Dakin Building at Sierra Point, Brisbane, California. The underlying fill was deposited from 1965 to 1985, mostly consisting of construction debris from San Francisco and some municipal wastes. Aerial photographs prior to 1965 show this area to be tidelands of the San Francisco Bay. A clay cap was constructed over the debris prior to building approval.

A notable example is Sydney Olympic Park, the primary venue for the 2000 Summer Olympic Games, which was built atop an industrial wasteland that included landfills.

Another strategy for landfill is the incineration of landfill trash at high temperature via the plasma-arc gasification process, which is currently used at two facilities in Japan, and will be used at a planned facility in St. Lucie County, Florida.

Environmental impact

Draining wetlands for ploughing, for example, is a form of habitat destruction. In some parts of the world, new reclamation projects are restricted or no longer allowed, due to environmental protection laws. Reclamation projects have strong negative impacts on coastal populations, although some species can take advantage of the newly created area. A 2022 global analysis estimated that 39% of losses (approximately ) and 14% of gains (approximately ) of tidal wetlands (mangroves, tidal flats, and tidal marshes) between 1999-2019 were due to direct human activities, including conversion to aquaculture, agriculture, plantations, coastal developments and other physical structures.

Environmental legislation

The State of California created a state commission, the San Francisco Bay Conservation and Development Commission, in 1965 to protect San Francisco Bay and regulate development near its shores.  The commission was created in response to growing concern over the shrinking size of the bay.

Hong Kong legislators passed the Protection of the Harbour Ordinance, proposed by the Society for Protection of the Harbour, in 1997 in an effort to safeguard the increasingly threatened Victoria Harbour against encroaching land development. Several large reclamation schemes at Green Island, West Kowloon, and Kowloon Bay were subsequently shelved, and others reduced in size.

Dangers
Reclaimed land is highly susceptible to soil liquefaction during earthquakes, which can amplify the amount of damage that occurs to buildings and infrastructure. Subsidence is another issue, both from soil compaction on filled land, and also when wetlands are enclosed by levees and drained to create Polders. Drained marshes will eventually sink below the surrounding water level, increasing the danger from flooding.

Land amounts added

Asia

Europe
 Netherlands 
The province of Flevoland has almost completely been reclaimed from the Zuiderzee.
 Monaco 

Others
 Eko Atlantic, Lagos, Nigeria—25 square kilometers 
 New Zealand – significant areas of land totalling several hundred hectares have been reclaimed along the harbourfronts of Auckland, Wellington and Dunedin. The international airports serving Auckland and Wellington have had significant reclamation for runway use.

See also
 Artificial island
 Great wall of sand
 Marine regression – the formation of new land by reductions in sea level
 Drainage system (agriculture) – drainage for land reclamation
 Land improvement
 Land recycling
 Hong Kong Society for Protection of the Harbour
 Mine reclamation
 Polder – low-lying land reclaimed from a lake or sea
 Reclamation of Wellington Harbour, New Zealand
 River reclamation
 Water reclamation
 Rainbowing

Notes

References
 
 
 
 http://gulfnews.com/news/gulf/bahrain/bahrain-parliament-wants-solution-to-land-reclamation-issue-1.567052

External links

 The Cape Town Foreshore Plan 1947
 The Canadian Land Reclamation Association
The case for offshore Mumbai airport

 
Coastal construction
Riparian zone
Environmental issues with water
Environmental soil science